The men's shot put at the 2012 African Championships in Athletics was held at the Stade Charles de Gaulle on 27 June.

Medalists

Records

Schedule

Results

Final

References

Results

Shot put Men
Shot put at the African Championships in Athletics